The 2011 East Carolina Pirates football team represented East Carolina University in the 2011 NCAA Division I FBS football season. The Pirates were led by second year head coach Ruffin McNeill and played their home games at Dowdy–Ficklen Stadium. They were a member of the East Division of Conference USA. The Pirates finished 4–4 in Conference USA and 5–7 overall. For the first time since 2005, the Pirates were not eligible to play in a bowl game.

Schedule

Postseason awards
 Lance Lewis WR - Second Team All-Conference USA Offense
 Emmanuel Davis CB - Second Team All-Conference USA Defense
 Jeremy Grove LB - Honorable Mention All-Conference USA, C-USA Freshman-of-the-Year, C-USA All-Freshman Team, Freshman All-American
 Justin Hardy WR - C-USA All-Freshman Team

References

East Carolina
East Carolina Pirates football seasons
East Carolina Pirates football